Plesiobaris is a genus of flower weevils in the beetle family Curculionidae. There are about seven described species in Plesiobaris.

Species
These seven species belong to the genus Plesiobaris:
 Plesiobaris aemula Casey, 1892
 Plesiobaris albilata (LeConte, 1876)
 Plesiobaris connectans Blatchley & W.S., 1920
 Plesiobaris disjuncta Casey, 1892
 Plesiobaris rufina Casey, 1920
 Plesiobaris signatipes Casey, 1892
 Plesiobaris t-signum (Boheman, 1844)

References

Further reading

 
 
 

Baridinae
Articles created by Qbugbot